Peter Ramiro Méndez  (born January 27, 1964 in Melo) is a former Uruguayan footballer.

International career
Méndez made nine appearances for the senior Uruguay national football team from 1991 to 1992. He made his debut in a friendly match against Peru (1-0 loss) on June 12, 1991 in Lima, Peru.

Career statistics

International

References

 

1964 births
Living people
Uruguayan footballers
Uruguay international footballers
1991 Copa América players
Uruguayan Primera División players
Categoría Primera A players
Liverpool F.C. (Montevideo) players
Defensor Sporting players
Millonarios F.C. players
RCD Mallorca players
Club Universitario de Deportes footballers
Uruguayan expatriate footballers
Expatriate footballers in Colombia
Expatriate footballers in Peru
Expatriate footballers in Spain

Association football forwards